Haplochromis chilotes is a species of cichlid endemic to Lake Victoria.  This species grows to a length of  SL.

References

chilotes
Fish described in 1911
Taxonomy articles created by Polbot